A. J. Wallace may refer to:

 Ajahni Wallace (born 2003), Jamaican rugby league footballer
 A. J. Wallace (American football) (born 1988), American football college cornerback and kick returner
 Albert Joseph Wallace (1853–1939), American politician, Lieutenant Governor of California from 1910 to 1914